"Run On" is a song by American electronica musician Moby. It was released as the second single from his fifth studio album Play on April 26, 1999. The song incorporates prominent vocal samples from "Run On for a Long Time" by Bill Landford and the Landfordairs.

Background and composition
Recorded by Moby for his fifth studio album Play, "Run On" features samples from "Run On for a Long Time", a 1949 recording by Bill Landford and the Landfordairs of the traditional folk hymn "God's Gonna Cut You Down", which make up the song's vocal content. Moby was unaware of the original hymn's considerable popularity in country and gospel music as a standard while recording the song. He later recalled that "Run On" was "really hard to put together, because it has so many samples in it. I didn't use computers at this point, it was all done with stand-alone samplers. When it was finished, I collapsed in exhaustion."

Music video
The music video for "Run On" was directed by Mike Mills. Mills' video depicts Moby working at an office whose employees all wear white. A flashback is then shown involving a workout instructor who faints while teaching a class; Moby then arrives and puts an inhaler in her mouth, reviving her. The video proceeds through subsequent flashbacks to explain the entire plot: the office Moby works in is heaven, the instructor is self-conscious and unsure of her capabilities, and heaven is a self-help phone line. Towards the end of the video, Moby is seen dead in a parking lot, with a man checking his pulse. The video concludes similarly to the opening scene, with Moby working in an office while still living, only everyone is unkind and emotionally distant.

Track listing
 CD single 
 "Run On" – 3:33
 "Spirit" – 4:12
 "Running" – 7:07

 CD single – extended 
 "Run On"  – 4:24
 "Sunday" – 5:00
 "Down Slow"  – 5:56

 12-inch single 
 "Run On"  – 6:08
 "Run On"  – 5:08
 "Run On"  – 3:55

 CD single 
 "Honey" – 3:27
 "Honey"  – 4:49
 "Honey"  – 6:41
 "Honey"  – 6:24
 "Run On"  – 4:27
 "Run On"  – 6:05
 "Run On"  – 6:01
 "Memory Gospel" – 6:42

Charts

References

External links
 

1999 singles
1999 songs
Moby songs
Mute Records singles
Songs written by Moby